1995 was designated as:
 United Nations Year for Tolerance
 World Year of Peoples' Commemoration of the Victims of the Second World War

This was the first year that the Internet was entirely privatized, with the United States government no longer providing public funding, marking the beginning of the Information Age. America Online and Prodigy offered access to the World Wide Web system for the first time this year, releasing browsers that made it easily accessible to the general public.

Events

January
 January 1
 The World Trade Organization (WTO) is established to replace the General Agreement on Tariffs and Trade (GATT).
Austria, Finland and Sweden join the European Union.
 January 9 – Valeri Polyakov completes 366 days in space while aboard the Mir space station, breaking a duration record.
 January 17 – The 6.9  Great Hanshin earthquake strikes the southern Hyōgo Prefecture of Japan with a maximum Shindo of VII, leaving 5,502–6,434 people dead, and 251,301–310,000 displaced.
 January 25 – Norwegian rocket incident: A rocket launched from the space exploration centre at Andøya, Norway, is briefly interpreted by the Russians as an incoming attack.
 January 31 – Mexican peso crisis: U.S. President Bill Clinton invokes emergency powers to extend a $20 billion loan to help Mexico avert financial collapse.

February
 February 13 – Twenty-one Bosnian Serb commanders are charged with genocide and crimes against humanity in the United Nations' International Criminal Tribunal for the former Yugoslavia, a tribunal on human rights violations during the Wars in the Balkans.
 February 21 – Steve Fossett lands in Leader, Saskatchewan, Canada, becoming the first person to make a solo flight across the Pacific Ocean in a balloon.
 February 25 – The Amazon Cooperation Treaty Organization (ACTO) (Organización del Tratado de Cooperación Amazónica [OTCA]) is formed.
 February 26 – The United Kingdom's oldest investment banking firm, Barings Bank, collapses after securities broker Nick Leeson loses $1.4 billion by speculating on the Tokyo Stock Exchange.

March
 March 1
 Julio María Sanguinetti is sworn in as President of Uruguay for his second term.
 Polish Prime Minister Waldemar Pawlak resigns from Parliament and is replaced by ex-communist Józef Oleksy.
 March 3 – United Nations Operation in Somalia II, the United Nations peacekeeping mission in Somalia, ends.
 March 14 – Astronaut Norman Thagard becomes the first American to ride into space aboard a Russian launch vehicle (the Soyuz TM-21), lifting off from the Baikonur Cosmodrome in Kazakhstan.
 March 18 - Michael Jordan announced his return to the Chicago Bulls and the NBA through a two-word press release: “I’m back.”
 March 20 – Members of the doomsday cult Aum Shinrikyo carry out the Tokyo subway sarin attack, killing 14 people and leading to over a thousand injured. The attack remains the deadliest terrorist incident in Japanese history.
 March 22 – Cosmonaut Valeri Polyakov returns after setting a record for 438 days in outer space.
 March 25 – Boxer Mike Tyson is released from prison after serving nearly 3 years.
 March 26 – The Schengen Agreement, easing cross-border travel, goes into effect in several European countries.
 March 31 
TAROM Flight 371 from Bucharest to Brussels crashes shortly after takeoff killing all 60 people on board.
American singer Selena is murdered by her fan club president, Yolanda Saldívar.

April 

 April 7 – First Chechen War – Samashki massacre: Russian paramilitary troops begin a massacre of at least 250 civilians in Samashki, Chechnya.
 April 19 – Oklahoma City bombing: 168 people, including eight federal Marshals and 19 children, are killed at the Alfred P. Murrah Federal Building and 680 are wounded by a bomb set off by Timothy McVeigh.
 April 30 – The United States government stops funding the NSFNET, making the Internet a wholly privatized system.

May 
 May 7 – Jacques Chirac is elected president of France.
 May 11 – More than 170 countries agree to extend the Nuclear Nonproliferation Treaty indefinitely and without conditions.
Sega launches the Saturn game console in North America four months before its initial scheduled date.
 May 13 – The 6.6  Western Macedonia earthquake strikes northwestern Greece with a maximum Mercalli intensity of VIII (Severe), injuring 25 and causing $450 million in damage.
 May 14 – The Dalai Lama proclaims 6-year-old Gedhun Choekyi Nyima as the 11th reincarnation of the Panchen Lama.
 May 16 – Following the Tokyo subway sarin attack two months earlier, Japanese police besiege the headquarters of Aum Shinrikyo near Mount Fuji and arrest cult leader Shoko Asahara. Further police operations result in over two hundred arrests and thirteen members of the cult, including Asahara, are sentenced to death.
 May 24 – AFC Ajax wins the UEFA Champions League at the Ernst Happel Stadium in Vienna by defeating A.C. Milan 1–0.
 May 25 – The Army of Republika Srpska (VRS) launched an artillery attack against the town of Tuzla, which left 71 dead and 240 wounded. The event is also known as the Tuzla massacre. 
 May 28 – The 7.0  Neftegorsk earthquake strikes northern Sakhalin Island in Russia with a maximum Mercalli intensity of IX (Violent), leaving 1,967 people dead and 750 injured.

June
 June 2
 Mrkonjić Grad incident: A United States Air Force F-16 piloted by Captain Scott O'Grady is shot down over Bosnia and Herzegovina while patrolling the NATO no-fly zone. O'Grady is rescued by U.S. Marines six days later.
 Waffen-SS Hauptsturmführer Erich Priebke is extradited from Argentina to Italy.
 June 6
 U.S. astronaut Norman Thagard breaks NASA's space endurance record of 14 days, 1 hour and 16 minutes, aboard the Russian space station Mir.
 The Constitutional Court of South Africa abolishes capital punishment in South Africa in the case of S v Makwanyane and Another.
 June 13 – French President Jacques Chirac announces the resumption of nuclear tests in French Polynesia.
 June 16 – The IOC selects Salt Lake City to host the 2002 Winter Olympics.
 June 22 – Japanese police rescue 365 hostages from a hijacked All Nippon Airways Flight 857 (Boeing 747-200) at Hakodate airport. The hijacker was armed with a knife and demanded the release of Shoko Asahara.
 June 24 – South Africa wins the Rugby World Cup.
 June 29
 Lisa Clayton completes her 10-month solo circumnavigation from the Northern Hemisphere.
 STS-71: Space Shuttle Atlantis docks with the Russian Mir space station for the first time.
 The Sampoong Department Store collapses in the Seocho-gu district of Seoul, South Korea, killing 502 and injuring 937.
 Iraq disarmament crisis: According to UNSCOM, the unity of the U.N. Security Council begins to fray, as a few countries, particularly France and Russia, become more interested in making financial deals with Iraq than in disarming the country.

July

 July – Iraq disarmament crisis: Iraq threatens to end all cooperation with UNSCOM and IAEA, if sanctions against the country are not lifted by August 31. Following the defection of his son-in-law, Hussein Kamel al-Majid, Saddam Hussein makes new revelations about the full extent of Iraq's biological and nuclear weapons programs. Iraq also withdraws its last U.N. declaration of prohibited biological weapons and turns over a large amount of new documents on its WMD programs.
 July 1 – Iraq disarmament crisis: In response to UNSCOM's evidence, Iraq admits for first time the existence of an offensive biological weapons program, but denies weaponization.
 July 4 – Prime Minister of the United Kingdom John Major is re-elected as leader of the Conservative Party.
 July 9 – Sri Lankan Civil War: 125 civilians are killed in Navaly as result of bombing by the Sri Lanka Air Force.
 July 10 – Burmese dissident Aung San Suu Kyi is freed from house arrest.
 July 11 
 Srebrenica massacre: Units of the Army of Republika Srpska, under the command of General Ratko Mladić, enter Srebrenica with little resistance from Dutch peacekeepers of the United Nations Protection Force, going on to kill thousands of Bosniak men and boys and rape many women.
 President Clinton announces the restoration of United States–Vietnam relations twenty years after the Vietnam War.
 A Cubana de Aviación Antonov An-24 crashes into the Caribbean off southeast Cuba killing 44 people.

 July 21–26 – Third Taiwan Strait Crisis: The Chinese People's Liberation Army fires missiles into the waters north of Taiwan.

August 
 August – The International Rugby Football Board declares that rugby union players may be professional.
 August 4 – Croatian forces, with the cooperation of the ARBiH, launch Operation Storm against rebel forces of the Republic of Serbian Krajina, which subsequently ceases to exist as a political entity.
August 7 – The Chilean government declares state of emergency in the southern half of the country in response to an event of intense, cold, wind, rain and snowfall known as the White Earthquake.
August 14 - The Nepali Prime Minister Man Mohan Adhikari along with seven other high-ranking officials survives Helicopter crash.
 August 16 – Bermudans reject independence in a referendum.
 August 29 – Eduard Shevardnadze, the Georgian head of state, survives an assassination attempt in Tbilisi.
 August 30 – The NATO bombing campaign against Bosnian Serb artillery positions begins in Bosnia and Herzegovina, continuing into September. At the same time, ARBiH forces begin an offensive against the Bosnian Serb Army around Sarajevo, central Bosnia and Bosnian Krajina.

September
 September – The European Parliament elects the first European Ombudsman, Jacob Söderman, who takes up office in September 1995.
 September 3– eBay is founded by Pierre Omidyar.
 September 4–15 The Fourth World Conference on Women in Beijing with over 4,750 delegates from 181 countries in attendance.
 September 6 – NATO air strikes against Bosnian Serb forces continue, after repeated attempts at a solution to the Bosnian War fail.
 September 9 – Sony enters the North American video game market with the release of the PlayStation.
 September 19 – The Washington Post and The New York Times publish the Unabomber manifesto
 September 26 – The trial against former Italian Prime Minister Giulio Andreotti, who is accused of Mafia connections, begins.
 September 27–28 – Bob Denard's mercenaries capture President Said Mohammed Djohor of the Comoros; the local army does not resist.

October
 October 3 – O. J. Simpson is found not guilty of double murder for the deaths of former wife Nicole Brown Simpson and Ronald Goldman.
 October 5 – Tansu Çiller of DYP forms the new government of Turkey (51st government, a minority government which failed to receive the vote of confidence).
 October 6 – Michel Mayor and Didier Queloz announce the discovery of 51 Pegasi b, the first confirmed extrasolar planet orbiting an ordinary main-sequence star.
 October 16 – The Million Man March is held in Washington, D.C. The event was conceived by Nation of Islam leader Louis Farrakhan.
 October 24 – A total solar eclipse is visible from Iran, India, Thailand, and Southeast Asia.
 October 25 – A commuter train slams into a school bus in Fox River Grove, Illinois, killing seven students.
 October 26 – An avalanche hits the village Flateyri in Iceland, killing 20 people. It was the second of two deadly avalanches that occurred in Iceland during the calendar year.
 October 28 – A fire in Baku Metro, Azerbaijan, kills 289 passengers, becoming the world's worst subway disaster.
 October 30
 Quebec independentists narrowly lose a referendum for a mandate to negotiate independence from Canada.
 Tansu Çiller of DYP forms the new government of Turkey.

November
 November – The Indian government officially renames the city of Bombay, restoring the name Mumbai.
 November 1
 The last signal is received from NASA's Pioneer 11 spacecraft.
 Participants in the Yugoslav Wars begin negotiations at the Wright-Patterson Air Force Base in Dayton, Ohio.
 November 2 – The Supreme Court of Argentina orders the extradition of ex-S.S. captain Erich Priebke.
 November 4 – Israeli Prime Minister Yitzhak Rabin is assassinated at a peace rally in Tel Aviv.
 November 7 – Typhoon Angela leaves the Philippines and Vietnam devastated, with 882 deaths and US$315 million in damage.
 November 12 – The Millbrook Commonwealth Action Programme, a programme to implement the Harare Declaration, is announced by the Commonwealth Heads of Government.
 November 16 – A United Nations tribunal charges Radovan Karadžić and Ratko Mladić with genocide during the Bosnian War.
 November 19 – A car bomb explosion outside the Egyptian Embassy in Islamabad, Pakistan destroys the face of the building, killing at least 13 people and wounding dozens more.
 November 21 – The Dayton Agreement to end the Bosnian War is reached at Wright-Patterson Air Force Base near Dayton, Ohio (signed December 14).
 November 22
 The 7.3  Gulf of Aqaba earthquake shakes the Sinai Peninsula and Saudi Arabia region with a maximum Mercalli intensity of VIII (Severe), killing eight and injuring 30, and generating a non-destructive tsunami.
 The first-ever full-length computer-animated feature film, Toy Story, is released by Pixar and Walt Disney Pictures.
 November 28 – Twenty-seven nations sign the Barcelona Treaty, creating the Union for the Mediterranean.
 November 30 – Operation Desert Storm officially ends.

December
December 3 – Strikes paralyze France's public sector.
 December 6 – The United States Food and Drug Administration approved Saquinavir, the first protease inhibitor to treat HIV/AIDS. Within 2 years of its approval, annual deaths from AIDS in the United States fell from over 50,000 to approximately 18,000.
 December 7 – NASA's Galileo Probe enters Jupiter's atmosphere.
 December 8 – Five-year-old Gyaincain Norbu is enthroned as the 11th reincarnation of the Panchen Lama at Tashilhunpo Monastery.
 December 9 – Godzilla vs. Destoroyah is released by Toho Studios, the last Godzilla incarnation in the "Heisei" era of Godzilla films.
 December 14 – The Dayton Agreement is signed in Paris, officially ending the Bosnian War.
 December 16 – Iraq disarmament crisis: Iraqi scuba divers, under the direction of the United Nations Special Commission, dredge the Tigris near Baghdad. The divers find over 200 prohibited Russian-made missile instruments and components.
 December 20
 American Airlines Flight 965 (Boeing 757) crashes into a mountain near Buga, Valle del Cauca, Colombia, killing 160 of the 164 on board.
 NATO begins peacekeeping in Bosnia.
 December 23 – According to Indian government official confirmed report, Rajiv Marriage Palace caught fire in Haryana, India, killing 442 persoms.  
This equals the record set at Braemar, Aberdeenshire in 1895 and 1982.

Date unknown
 Sudden oak death, the tree disease caused by the plant pathogen Phytophthora ramorum, is first observed, in California.
 The existence of the Top Quark is announced by the international scientific community.
 The first SampTA conference for mathematicians, engineers, and applied scientists is held in Riga, Latvia.

World population

Births

January

 January 1
 Sardar Azmoun, Iranian footballer
 Poppy, American musician and model
 January 3 
 Jisoo, South Korean singer, actress, and model
 Seolhyun, South Korean singer, actress, and model
 January 4 – María Isabel, Spanish singer
 January 5 – Miriam Sylla, Italian volleyball player
 January 6 – Michaela DePrince, Sierra Leonean-American ballet dancer
 January 9 – Nicola Peltz, American actress
 January 12 
 Allisha Gray, American basketball player
 Alessio Romagnoli, Italian footballer
 Maverick Viñales, Spanish motorcycle racer
 January 13 – Natalia Dyer, American actress
 January 16 – Takumi Minamino, Japanese footballer
 January 19 
 Mathieu van der Poel, Dutch bicycle racer
 Maxi Rolón, Argentine footballer (d. 2022)
 January 20
 Joey Badass, American rapper
 Calum Chambers, English footballer
 José María Giménez, Uruguayan footballer
 January 21 – Marine Johannès, French basketball player
 January 24 – Callan McAuliffe, Australian actor
 January 25 – Laura Nunnink, Dutch field hockey player
 January 30
 Danielle Campbell, American actress
 Viktoria Komova, Russian artistic gymnast
 January 31 – Nina Sublatti, Georgian singer and model

February

 February 1 – Oliver Heldens, Dutch DJ and electronic music producer 
 February 3 – Tao Tsuchiya, Japanese actress
 February 4 – Pione Sisto, South Sudanese-Danish footballer
 February 5 – Adnan Januzaj, Belgian footballer
 February 6
 Leon Goretzka, German footballer
 Nyck de Vries, Dutch racing driver 
 February 8 – Joshua Kimmich, German footballer
 February 9 – Mario Pašalić, Croatian footballer
 February 10 – Naby Keïta, Guinean footballer
 February 11 
 Milan Škriniar, Slovak footballer
 Yang Zhaoxuan, Chinese tennis player
 February 15 – Megan Thee Stallion, American rapper
 February 16 – Denzel Curry, American rapper
 February 17 – Madison Keys, American tennis player
 February 18 – Mikhail Kolyada, Russian figure skater
 February 23 
 Valarie Allman, American discus thrower
 Andrew Wiggins, Canadian basketball player
 February 27 – Sergej Milinković-Savić, Serbian footballer
 February 28 – Lauren Carlini, American volleyball player

March

 March 2 – Mats Møller Dæhli, Norwegian footballer
 March 3 – Maine Mendoza, Filipina television personality
 March 4 – Malin Aune, Norwegian handball player
 March 7 – Haley Lu Richardson, American actress
 March 8 – Keita Baldé, Senegalese footballer
 March 9 
 Ángel Correa, Argentine footballer
 Cierra Ramirez, American actress and singer 
 March 10 – Zach LaVine, American basketball player 
 March 13 – Mikaela Shiffrin, American skier
 March 15 – Jabari Parker, American basketball player
 March 17 – Claressa Shields, American boxer
 March 19
 Héctor Bellerín, Spanish footballer
 Julia Montes, Filipina actress
 March 23 – Ester Ledecká, Czech winter athlete
 March 25 – Carlos Vinícius, Brazilian footballer
 March 27 – Zaur Uguev, Russian freestyle wrestler
 March 30 – Tao Geoghegan Hart, British cyclist

April

 April 1 – Logan Paul, American actor and YouTube personality
 April 3 – Adrien Rabiot, French footballer
 April 5
 Nguyễn Phương Khánh, Vietnamese model and beauty queen, Miss Earth 2018 
 Zofia Wichłacz, Polish actress
 April 7 – Tiril Sjåstad Christiansen, Norwegian freestyle skier
 April 12 – Bartosz Zmarzlik, Polish motorcycle speedway rider
 April 15 – Chiaka Ogbogu, American volleyball player
 April 17 – Wheein, South Korean singer and songwriter 
 April 18 – Divock Origi, Belgian footballer
 April 19 – Chloé Valentini, French handball player
 April 21 
 Ruahei Demant, New Zealand rugby union player
 María José Granatto, Argentine field hockey player
 Jonathan Hilbert, German racewalker
 April 23 – Gigi Hadid, American fashion model
 April 24 – Kehlani, American singer
 April 26 – Daniel Padilla, Filipino actor
 April 28 – Melanie Martinez, American singer

May

 May 1
 Jake Cannavale, American musician and actor
 Radhika Madan, Indian actress and dancer 
 May 2 – Yook Sung-jae, South Korean singer and actor
 May 3 – Zach Sobiech, American singer-songwriter and musician (d. 2013)
 May 4 – Kiiara, American singer and songwriter
 May 6 – Marko Pjaca, Croatian footballer
 May 7 – Fred Kerley, American sprinter
 May 9 
 Timothé Luwawu-Cabarrot, French basketball player
 Beth Mead, English footballer
 May 10
 Missy Franklin, American swimmer
 Gabriella Papadakis, French ice dancer
 May 11
 Gelson Martins, Portuguese footballer
 Shira Haas, Israeli actress
 May 12 – Kenton Duty, American actor, singer, and dancer
 May 14 – Kelly Gale, Swedish model
 May 15 – Ksenia Sitnik, Belarusian singer
 May 25 – José Luis Gayà, Spanish footballer
 May 29 – Nicolas Pépé, Ivorian footballer
 May 30 – Lukáš Rohan, Czech canoeist

June

 June 2 – Evelyn Mawuli, Japanese basketball player
 June 4 – Willie Rioli, Australian football player
 June 5 – Troye Sivan, South African-born Australian singer
 June 13 – Petra Vlhová, Slovak alpine skier
 June 15 
 Manika Batra, Indian table tennis player
 Emmanuel Korir, Kenyan middle distance runner
 June 16 – Joseph Schooling, Singaporean swimmer
 June 19 – Raphael Veiga, Brazilian footballer
 June 21 
 Darko Velkovski, Macedonian footballer
 Jesper Karlström, Swedish footballer
 June 22 
 Aleksandr Maltsev, Russian artistic (synchronized) swimmer
 Sara Kolak, Croatian javelin thrower
 June 23 – Danna Paola, Mexican singer and actress
 June 28
 Demi-Leigh Nel-Peters, South African model and beauty pageant titleholder
 Adama Traoré, Malian footballer
 June 30 
 Marina Ruy Barbosa, Brazilian actress
 Kristoffer Olsson, Swedish footballer
 Maria Shurochkina, Russian synchronised swimmer

July

 July 1 – Krzysztof Piątek, Polish footballer
 July 2 
 Ruth B., Canadian singer and songwriter
 Ryan Murphy, American competitive swimmer 
  July 4
 Álex Berenguer, Spanish footballer
 Vanessa Herzog, Austrian speed skater
 Post Malone, American rapper
 July 5 
 Hyuk, South Korean singer and actor
 Phataimas Muenwong, Thai badminton player
 July 9
 Georgie Henley, English actress
 Sandro Ramírez, Spanish footballer
 July 10
 Trayvon Bromell, American sprinter
 Ada Hegerberg, Norwegian footballer
 Edymar Martínez, Venezuelan model
 Lu Shanglei, Chinese chess grandmaster
 July 12 
 Jordyn Wieber, American artistic gymnast
 Luke Shaw, English footballer
 Yohio, Swedish singer and songwriter
 July 13
 Cody Bellinger, American baseball player
 Dante Exum, Australian basketball player 
 July 14 – Serge Gnabry, German footballer
 July 15 – Vivianne Miedema, Dutch football player
 July 18 – Nedim Remili, French handball player
 July 19 
 Manuel Akanji, Swiss footballer
 María José Alvarado, Honduran model (d. 2014)
 Matt Miazga, American soccer player
 Maria Paseka, Russian artistic gymnast
 July 23 – Hwasa, South Korean singer, songwriter, and rapper
 July 24 – Kyle Kuzma, American basketball player
 July 25 – Maria Sakkari, Greek tennis player
 July 30 – Hirving Lozano, Mexican footballer
 July 31 – Lil Uzi Vert, American rapper

August

 August 1 – Madison Cawthorn, American politician
 August 2 
 Kevin Sanjaya Sukamuljo, Indonesian badminton player
 Kristaps Porziņģis, Latvian basketball player
 August 4
 Bruna Marquezine, Brazilian actress
 Jessica Sanchez, American singer
 İrem Yaman, Turkish taekwando practitioner
 August 5 – Pierre-Emile Højbjerg, Danish footballer
 August 6 – Sasha Vezenkov, Bulgarian professional basketball player 
 August 9 – Hwang Min-hyun, South Korean singer-songwriter and actor
 August 12 
 Sara Ali Khan, Indian actress
 Andy Cruz, Cuban boxer
 August 13 – Presnel Kimpembe, French footballer
 August 15 – Chief Keef, American rapper
 August 16 – James Young, American basketball player
 August 17 – Gracie Gold, American figure skater
 August 20 – Magnus Landin Jacobsen, Danish handball player
 August 22 
 Dua Lipa, English singer 
 Jonnu Smith, American football player
 August 23 – Cecilie Uttrup Ludwig, Danish cyclist
 August 24 
 Lady Amelia Windsor, member of the British royal family
 Justine Skye, American singer 
 August 26
 Gracie Dzienny, American actress
 Solomon Thomas, American football player
 Hannah van der Westhuysen, British actress
 August 27 – Sergey Sirotkin, Russian racing driver
 August 28 – Andreas Wellinger, German ski jumper

September

 September 1
 Munir El Haddadi, Spanish footballer
 Nathan MacKinnon, Canadian hockey player
 September 2 
 Josine Koning, Dutch field hockey player
 Kian Lawley, American Youtuber, influencer, and actor
 September 3
 Myles Jack, American football player
 Niklas Süle, German footballer
 September 5 
 Jacob Holm, Danish handball player
 Caroline Sunshine, American actress, dancer, singer and political operative
 September 6 – Bertrand Traoré, Burkinabé footballer
 September 8 – Julian Weigl, German footballer
 September 12
 Steven Gardiner, Bahamian sprinter
 Ryan Potter, American actor
 Benjamin Thomas, French track cyclist
 September 13 – Robbie Kay, British actor
 September 14 
 Sander Sagosen, Norwegian handball player
 Deshaun Watson, American football player
 September 15 – Awer Mabil, Australian association footballer
 September 16 – Aaron Gordon, American basketball player
 September 17 – Patrick Mahomes, American football player
 September 20 – Laura Dekker, Dutch sailor
 September 22 – Nayeon, South Korean singer
 September 23
 Eli Dershwitz, American fencer
 Agnes Jebet Tirop, Kenian athlete (d. 2021)
 September 25 –
Todd Hazelwood, Australian racing drivers
 September 27 – Yoshihito Nishioka, Japanese tennis player

October

 October 1 – Agostina Alonso, Argentine field hockey player
 October 4
 Mikolas Josef, Czech singer and music producer
 Jabrill Peppers, American football player
 Jeonghan, South Korean singer
 October 6 – Justine Wong-Orantes, American volleyball player 
 October 7 – Slađana Mirković, Serbian volleyball player
 October 9 – Kenny Tete, Dutch footballer
 October 13 – Jimin, South Korean singer
 October 15 – Billy Unger, American actor and musician
 October 17 – Queen Naija, American singer
 October 21 
 Doja Cat, American singer and rapper
 Yulimar Rojas, Venezuelan triple jumper
 October 23 – Ireland Baldwin, American fashion model and actress
 October 25 
 Conchita Campbell, Canadian actress
 Jock Landale, Australian basketball player
 October 28 – Mia Wray, Australian pop musician

November

 November 1 – Nour El Sherbini, Egyptian squash player
 November 2 – Hanna Öberg, Swedish biathlete
 November 3
 Kelly Catlin, American racing cyclist (d. 2019)
 Kendall Jenner, American model and television personality
 November 5 – Madison McLaughlin, American Actress
 November 6 
 Tamara Horacek, French handball player
 André Silva, Portuguese footballer
 November 8 – Xan de Waard, Dutch field hockey player
 November 12 – Romina Pourmokhtari, Swedish politician
 November 15 – Karl-Anthony Towns, Dominican-American basketball player
 November 17 – Elise Mertens, Belgian tennis player  
 November 18 – Ihsan Maulana Mustofa, Indonesian badminton player
 November 19
 Vanessa Axente, Hungarian fashion model
 Asuka Teramoto, Japanese artistic gymnast
 Melinda Ademi, Kosovan singer 
 November 20 
 Timothy Cheruiyot, Kenyan athlete
 Michael Clifford, Australian guitarist and singer
 Kateryna Reznik, Ukrainian synchronised swimmer
 November 22 – Katherine McNamara, American actress
 November 28 
 Tin Jedvaj, Croatian footballer
 Chase Elliott, American race car driver
 November 29 – Laura Marano, American actress and singer

December

 December 4 – Dina Asher-Smith, British sprinter
 December 5
 Anthony Martial, French footballer
 Kaetlyn Osmond, Canadian figure skater
 December 6 – A Boogie wit da Hoodie, American rapper and singer
 December 9
 McKayla Maroney, American gymnast
 Kelly Oubre Jr., American basketball player
 December 14 – Yulia Belokobylskaya, Russian gymnast
 December 15 – Yoshihide Kiryū, Japanese sprinter
 December 18 – Guerschon Yabusele, French basketball player
 December 18 – Lim Na-young, South Korean singer
 December 24 – Anett Kontaveit, Estonian tennis player
 December 27
 Timothée Chalamet, French-American actor
 Carlos Cuevas, Spanish actor
 December 29 – Ross Lynch, American actor
 December 30
 Sakura Fujiwara, Japanese actress
 V, South Korean singer
 Dominic Fike, American Singer
 Igor Shesterkin, Russian Ice Hockey Player
 December 30 – Fabiana Bytyqi, Czech boxer
 December 31 – Gabby Douglas, American gymnast

Deaths

January 

 January 1
Eugene Wigner, Hungarian physicist (b. 1902)
Fred West, English serial killer (b. 1941)
 January 2
Siad Barre, Somali military leader and statesman, 3rd President of Somalia (b. 1919)
Nancy Kelly, American actress (b. 1921)
 January 6 – Joe Slovo, ANC activist and South African minister of Housing (b. 1926)
 January 7 – Murray Rothbard, American economist (b. 1926)
 January 8 – Carlos Monzón, Argentine boxer (b. 1942)
 January 9
 Peter Cook, English comedian and writer (b. 1937)
 Souphanouvong, Laotian royal prince and Communist leader, 1st President of Laos (b. 1909)
 January 11 – Josef Gingold, Russian-American violinist (b. 1909)
 January 17 – Miguel Torga, Portuguese writer (b. 1907)
 January 18 – Adolf Butenandt, German biochemist, recipient of the Nobel Prize in Chemistry (b. 1903)
 January 20 – Mehdi Bazargan, 46th Prime Minister of Iran (b. 1907)
 January 22 – Rose Kennedy, American philanthropist (b. 1890)
 January 25
 John Smith, American actor (b. 1931)
 William Sylvester, American actor (b. 1922)
 January 30 – Gerald Durrell, British naturalist, author, and television presenter (b. 1925)
 January 31
 George Abbott, American writer, director, and producer (b. 1887)
 George Stibitz, American computational engineer (b. 1904)

February

 February 2
 Tikvah Alper, South African scientist (b. 1909)
 Fred Perry, English tennis champion (b. 1909)
 Donald Pleasence, English actor (b. 1919)
 February 4 – Patricia Highsmith, American author (b. 1921)
 February 5 – Doug McClure, American actor (b. 1935)
 February 6 
 James Merrill, American poet (b. 1926)
 Art Taylor, American jazz drummer (b. 1929)
 February 9 
 J. William Fulbright, American senator and congressman (b. 1905)
 David Wayne, American actor (b. 1914)
 February 12 – Robert Bolt, English dramatist (b. 1924)
 February 13 – Alberto Burri, Italian artist (b. 1915)
 February 14 – U Nu, Burmese politician, 1st Prime Minister of Burma (b. 1907)
 February 19 – John Howard, American actor (b. 1913)
 February 22 – Ed Flanders, American actor (b. 1934)
 February 23 – James Herriot, English veterinarian and author (b. 1916)
 February 24 – Hideko Maehata, Japanese swimmer (b. 1914)
 February 26 – Jack Clayton, British film director (b. 1921)

March

 March 1
 Georges J. F. Köhler, German biologist (b. 1946)
 Vladislav Listyev, Russian journalist (b. 1956)
 March 3 – Howard W. Hunter, American President of The Church of Jesus Christ of Latter-day Saints (b. 1907)
 March 5 – Vivian Stanshall, English comedian, writer, artist, broadcaster, and musician (b. 1943)
 March 8 
 Paul Horgan, American writer (b. 1903)
 Ingo Schwichtenberg, German drummer (b. 1965)
 March 9
 Edward Bernays, Austrian-born American propagandist (b. 1891)
 Yisrael Galil, Israeli firearm designer (b. 1923)
 March 10 – Ovidi Montllor, Spanish singer and actor (b. 1942)
 March 11 – Wilfred Jacobs, 1st Governor-General of Antigua and Barbuda (b. 1919)
 March 13 – Odette Hallowes, French intelligence officer (b. 1912)
 March 14 – William Alfred Fowler, American physicist (b. 1911)
 March 16 – Albert Hackett, American dramatist and screenwriter (b. 1900)
 March 17 
 Rick Aviles, American actor (b. 1952)
 Sunnyland Slim, American blues pianist (b. 1906)
 March 19 – Nike Ardilla, Indonesian singer, actress, and model (b. 1975)
 March 20
 Sidney Kingsley, American dramatist (b. 1906)
 John William Minton, American professional wrestler (b. 1948)
 March 23 – Davie Cooper, Scottish footballer (b. 1956)
 March 24 – Joseph Needham, British biochemist, historian, and sinologist (b. 1900)
 March 25 – James Samuel Coleman, American sociologist (b. 1926)
 March 26 – Eazy-E, American rapper and record producer (b. 1964)
 March 31 – Selena, American singer (b. 1971)

April

 April 2 – Hannes Alfvén, Swedish chemist (b. 1908)
 April 4
 Kenny Everett, British comedian (b. 1944)
 Priscilla Lane, American actress (b. 1915)
 April 6 – V. J. Sukselainen, Finnish politician, 24th Prime Minister of Finland (b. 1906)
 April 10 – Morarji Desai, 4th Prime Minister of India (b. 1896)
 April 14 – Burl Ives, American singer and actor (b. 1909)
 April 16 – Cy Endfield, American screenwriter (b. 1914)
 April 18 – Arturo Frondizi, Argentine lawyer and politician, 32nd President of Argentina (b. 1908)
 April 20 – Milovan Đilas, Yugoslav politician and philosopher (b. 1911)
 April 23 – Howard Cosell, American sportscaster (b. 1918)
 April 25
 Alexander Knox, Canadian actor and novelist (b. 1907)
 Ginger Rogers, American actress and dancer (b. 1911)
 April 27 – Willem Frederik Hermans, Dutch writer (b. 1921)
 April 30 – Maung Maung Kha, 5th Prime Minister of Burma (b. 1920)

May

 May 2 – Michael Hordern, English actor (b. 1911)
 May 4 – Louis Krasner, Ukrainian-American violinist (b. 1903)
 May 5 – Mikhail Botvinnik, Russian chess player (b. 1911)
 May 6 – Maria Pia de Saxe-Coburgo e Bragança, Portuguese writer and journalist (b. 1907)
 May 8 – Teresa Teng, Taiwanese singer (b. 1953)
 May 12
 Arthur Lubin, American film director (b. 1898)
 Adolfo Pedernera, Argentinian footballer (b. 1918)
 Mia Martini, Italian singer and songwriter (b. 1947)
 May 14 – Christian B. Anfinsen, American chemist (b. 1916)
 May 15 – Eric Porter, English actor (b. 1928)
 May 16 – Lola Flores, Spanish singer, dancer and actress (b. 1923)
 May 18
 Elisha Cook Jr., American actor (b. 1903)
 Alexander Godunov, Russian ballet dancer and actor (b. 1949)
 Elizabeth Montgomery, American actress (b. 1933)
 May 21 – Les Aspin, American politician (b. 1938)
 May 22 - Stephen L. Price, American visual effects supervisor (b. 1960)
 May 24 – Harold Wilson, Prime Minister of the United Kingdom (b. 1916)
 May 25
 Krešimir Ćosić, Croatian professional basketball player and coach (b. 1948)
 Dany Robin, French actress (b. 1927)
 May 26 – Friz Freleng, American animator (b. 1906)
 May 29 – Margaret Chase Smith, American politician (b. 1897)
 May 30 – Ted Drake, English footballer (b. 1912)

June

 June 3 – J. Presper Eckert, American engineer (b. 1919)
 June 7 – Hsuan Hua, Chinese Buddhist (b. 1918)
 June 8 – Juan Carlos Onganía, 35th President of Argentina (b. 1914)
 June 12 – Arturo Benedetti Michelangeli, Italian pianist (b. 1920)
 June 14 – Rory Gallagher, Irish blues and rock guitarist (b. 1948)
 June 20 – Emil Cioran, Romanian philosopher and essayist (b. 1911)
 June 22 – Yves Congar, French cardinal (b. 1904)
 June 23 
 Jonas Salk, American medical researcher (b. 1914)
 Anatoly Tarasov, Russian ice hockey player and coach (b. 1918)
 June 25 
 Warren E. Burger, Chief Justice of the United States (b. 1907)
 Ernest Walton, Irish physicist and Nobel laureate (b. 1903)
 June 29 – Lana Turner, American actress (b. 1921)
 June 30
 Georgi Beregovoi, Russian cosmonaut (b. 1921)
 Gale Gordon, American actor (b. 1906)
 Phyllis Hyman, American singer and actress (b. 1949)

July

 July 1 
 Wolfman Jack, American disc jockey (b. 1938)
 Bruce Mitchell, South African cricketer (b. 1909)
 July 2 – George Seldes, American investigative journalist (b. 1890)
 July 3 – Pancho Gonzales, American tennis champion (b. 1928)
 July 4
 Eva Gabor, Hungarian-American actress, businesswoman, and socialite (b. 1919)
 Bob Ross, American television painter (b. 1942)
 July 5 – Takeo Fukuda, Japanese politician, 46th Prime Minister of Japan (b. 1905)
 July 6 – Aziz Nesin, Turkish writer (b. 1915)
 July 12 - John Yudkin, British nutritionist and physiologist (b. 1910)
 July 13 – Ashapoorna Devi, Indian author and poet (b. 1908) 
 July 16
 Patsy Ruth Miller, American actress (b. 1904)
 Stephen Spender, English poet and writer (b. 1909)
 July 17
 Juan Manuel Fangio, Argentine race car driver (b. 1911)
 Harry Guardino, American actor (b. 1925)
 July 18
 Fabio Casartelli, Italian cyclist (b. 1970)
 Srinagarindra, Thai princess (b. 1900) 
 July 20 – Genevieve Tobin, American actress (b. 1899)
 July 22 – Harold Larwood, British cricketer (b. 1904)
 July 24 – George Rodger, British photojournalist (b. 1908)
 July 25 – Charlie Rich, American singer (b. 1932)
 July 27 – Miklós Rózsa, Hungarian composer (b. 1907)

August

 August 3 – Ida Lupino, British-born American actress (b. 1918)
 August 9 – Jerry Garcia, American guitarist (The Grateful Dead) (b. 1942)
 August 11 – Phil Harris, American comedian and actor (b. 1904)
 August 13 – Mickey Mantle, American baseball player (b. 1931)
 August 19 – Pierre Schaeffer, French composer (b. 1910)
 August 20 – Hugo Pratt, Italian comics creator (b. 1927)
 August 21 – Subrahmanyan Chandrasekhar, Indian astrophysicist (b. 1910)
 August 22 – Johnny Carey, Irish football player and manager (b. 1919)
 August 24
 Gary Crosby, American singer and actor (b. 1933)
 Alfred Eisenstaedt, German-American photographer (b. 1898)
 August 29
 Michael Ende, German author (b. 1929)
 Frank Perry, American stage director and filmmaker (b. 1930)
 August 30
 Fischer Black, American economist (b. 1938)
 Lev Polugaevsky, Belarusian chess Grandmaster (b. 1934)

September

 September 4 – William Kunstler, American radical lawyer and civil rights activist (b. 1919)
 September 8 – Eileen Chang, Chinese writer (b. 1920)
 September 12 – Jeremy Brett, English actor (b. 1933)
 September 15
 Pedro Nolasco, Dominican boxer (b. 1963)
 Gunnar Nordahl, Swedish footballer (b. 1921)
 September 19 – Sir Rudolf Peierls, German-born British physicist (b. 1907)
 September 21 - Ken Willard, American animator (b. 1959)
 September 25 – Kei Tomiyama, Japanese actor, voice actor, and narrator (b. 1938)
 September 29 – Madalyn Murray O'Hair, American activist (b. 1919)

October

 October 5 
 Linda Gary, American film and television actress and voice actress (b. 1944)
 Pin Malakul, Thai educator and politician (b. 1903)
 October 9
 Alec Douglas-Home, Prime Minister of the United Kingdom (b. 1903)
 M.R. Kukrit Pramoj, Thai politician and 13th Prime Minister of Thailand (b. 1911)
 October 19 – Don Cherry, American jazz trumpeter (b. 1936)
 October 21 – Shannon Hoon, American singer-songwriter (b. 1967)
 October 22
 Andrés Aguilar Mawdsley Venezuelan lawyer and diplomat (b. 1924)
 Kingsley Amis, English writer (b. 1922)
 Mary Wickes, American actress (b. 1910)
 October 25
 Viveca Lindfors, Swedish actress (b. 1920)
 Bobby Riggs, American tennis player (b. 1918)
 October 26 – Wilhelm Freddie, Danish painter (b. 1909)
 October 31
 Alan Bush, British composer, pianist, and conductor (b. 1900)
 Rosalind Cash, American actress (b. 1938)
 Bill Rowling, 30th Prime Minister of New Zealand (b. 1927)

November

 November 4
 Gilles Deleuze, French philosopher (b. 1925)
 Paul Eddington, English actor (b. 1927) 
 Yitzhak Rabin, 5th Prime Minister of Israel (b. 1922)
 November 7 – Ann Dunham, American anthropologist (b. 1942)
 November 12 – Robert Stephens, English actor (b. 1931)
 November 20 – Sergei Grinkov, Russian figure skater (b. 1967)
 November 23 – Louis Malle, French film director (b. 1932)
 November 24 – Jeffrey Lynn, American actor (b. 1909)

December

 December 2 – Robertson Davies, Canadian novelist (b. 1913)
 December 9 – Vivian Blaine, American actress and singer (b. 1921)
 December 12 – Princess Caroline-Mathilde of Denmark, Danish princess (b. 1912)
 December 13 – Anatoly Dyatlov, Soviet engineer in charge during the Chernobyl disaster (b. 1931)
 December 18
 Nathan Rosen, Israeli physicist (b. 1909)
 Konrad Zuse, German engineer (b. 1910)
 December 20 – Madge Sinclair, Jamaican-American actress (b. 1938)
 December 22
 Butterfly McQueen, American actress (b. 1911)
 James Meade, English economist (b. 1907)
 December 23 – Patric Knowles, English actor (b. 1911)
 December 25
 Dean Martin, American actor, singer and comedian (b. 1917)
 Nicolas Slonimsky, Russian-American musicologist (b. 1894)
 December 27 – Edgar Bischoff, Romanian-born French composer (b. 1912)
 December 29 – Lita Grey, American actress (b. 1908)
 December 30 – Heiner Müller, German poet and playwright (b. 1929)

Date unknown
 Richey Edwards, Welsh musician (b. 1967)

Nobel Prizes

 Physics – Martin L. Perl, Frederick Reines
 Chemistry – Paul J. Crutzen, Mario J. Molina, F. Sherwood Rowland
 Medicine – Edward B. Lewis, Christiane Nüsslein-Volhard, Eric F. Wieschaus
 Literature – Seamus Heaney
 Bank of Sweden Prize in Economic Sciences in Memory of Alfred Nobel – Robert Lucas, Jr.
 Peace – Joseph Rotblat and the Pugwash Conferences on Science and World Affairs

References

External links
 1995: A look back - CNN
 CNN Time Capsule: The Defining Moments of 1995 - CNN